Palgrave is a Compact Rural Community and unincorporated place in the Town of Caledon, Regional Municipality of Peel in the Greater Toronto Area of Ontario, Canada. Palgrave is located east of Orangeville, south of Alliston, west of Newmarket and north of Brampton.

Geography
The moraine is a primary source for many river systems in this part of Southern Ontario. The nearby Palgrave Moraine intersects the Oak Ridges Moraine, and ultimately merges with it to the east, at the western boundary of King Township. The Humber River flows west of Palgrave. Several creeks and swampy ponds are found in the area and a former mill pond lies to the northwest. Mount Wolfe, one of the highest hills in the area, is located east of the town.

Population (2006): 830 persons in 274 households
Population (2011): 1002 persons
Population (2016): 1044 persons in 396 households
Name of inhabitants: Palgravian

History
Palgrave was originally called Buckstown after Brian Dolan, nicknamed Barney or Buck. He managed the Western Hotel after it was built in 1846. In 1869, postal authorities renamed the community Palgrave.

In 1877 Hamilton & North-Western Railway was constructed through the centre of Palgrave, from the southwest to the northeast. This railway was taken over by the Grand Trunk Railway in 1888, and later absorbed by Canadian National Railways. Much of the track throughout this region was damaged by flooding in 1954 as a result of Hurricane Hazel and had to be rebuilt. Palgrave was a flag station on the CNR.  Although there was a station with a passenger waiting room, the Agent at this location was removed in 1931. The station was located on the west side of the track (west of Hwy 50). Scheduled passenger service ended in July 1960 and the station was removed shortly thereafter. The rails over this section were removed in 1986.

In 1906 the Canadian Pacific Railway was constructed from Bolton towards Muskoka. This line passes to the east of Palgrave and remains as part of the CP mainline between Toronto and Sudbury. The Canadian Pacific's Palgrave station was located near Mount Pleasant Rd. 2 kilometers northeast of the village.

Canadian artist David B. Milne (1882–1953) lived in Palgrave for a short time from 1929 to 1932 and painted a number of scenes there. His work  Kitchen Chimney depicts a view of the town's Elm Tree Hotel and is part of the collection of the National Gallery of Canada.

Small housing developments were built around Palgrave in the 1950s, followed by estate home development and subdivisions beginning in the late 1960s.

Places of interest
Palgrave was bisected by a line of the Hamilton & North-Western Railway (mentioned above). The line was abandoned by CN in 1986 and has since been rehabilitated and incorporated into a multi-use regional recreational trail which is part of the Caledon Trailway, The Great Pine Ridge Trail and the Trans Canada Trail. The Bruce Trail, one of Ontario's major recreational hiking trails, passes the town roughly 1.5 km to the west.

Palgrave is home to the Caledon Equestrian Park, which played host to the equestrian portion of the 2015 Pan American Games. Many Equestrians who regularly horse show at the Caldeon Equestrian Park refer to the facility itself as Palgrave.

The Palgrave Forest and Wildlife Area lies on the northwest periphery of the town and offers trails for hiking and cross-country skiing. EfstonScience, an astronomy and science retail store in Toronto, Ontario, holds evening observing sessions at this Conservation Area.

In 1963, Walt Disney Productions filmed the family movie "Homeward Bound: The Incredible Journey" in Palgrave.

The Palgrave Public School has 462 students (2020) from Kindergarten to Grade 8.

Caledon Hills Brewery occupies what was the Church Public Inn founded by Terence Cutts 2010. This heritage site contains the 1865 St. Alban's (Anglican) church.

Palgrave is home of following clubs 

 Rotary Club of Palgrave
 Palgrave Tennis Club

Notable people
E.B. Cox - Internationally known sculptor and artist (1914-2003).  Contemporary and friend of the Group of Seven
Farley Mowat - Author, naturalist and adventurer.
William Abernethy Ogilvie - Painter and war artist
Skye Sweetnam - Singer, raised in nearby Cedar Mills.

Settlements
Castlederg, southwest
Cedar Mills, south
Cedar Meadows, southeast

Nearest communities
Bolton, south
Caledon East, west
Alliston, north
Schomberg, east

References

External links
Albion Hills Conservation Area, Toronto and Region Conservation
Dr. Richard Ehrlich, current owner of the historic Elm Tree Hotel building, hotel history page

Neighbourhoods in Caledon, Ontario